Leeuwenhoekiella blandensis  is a heterotrophic, rod-shaped and aerobic bacterium from the genus of Leeuwenhoekiella which has been isolated from seawater from the Mediterranean Sea.

References

External links
Type strain of Leeuwenhoekiella blandensis at BacDive -  the Bacterial Diversity Metadatabase

Flavobacteria
Bacteria described in 2006
Leeuwenhoekiella